Sarah Hayley Orrantia (born February 21, 1994) is an American actress, singer, and songwriter. She is best known for portraying Erica Goldberg on the ABC comedy series The Goldbergs. She was a member of Lakoda Rayne, a country pop girl group assembled by Paula Abdul during the first season of The X Factor. She released her debut single "Love Sick" in 2015. Her debut EP, The Way Out, was released in May 2019.

Early life
Sarah Hayley Orrantia was born in Arlington, Texas, on February 21, 1994, and grew up in nearby Grand Prairie and Highland Village. She is of English, French, Irish, and Spanish (her last name is of Basque origin) descent. She attended public school from elementary to middle school in her hometown of Highland Village.

She then attended Marcus High School in nearby Flower Mound until her junior year, when she decided to become homeschooled to pursue her music and acting training. In high school, she joined the musical theatre program, providing her with her first taste of acting. 

She is a Christian.

Career
Orrantia began singing at the age of nine and began professionally training at 12. She wrote her first song at 13. By 15, she had recorded her first EP of cover songs and begun writing with songwriter Jamie Houston who at the time was best known for writing hits for the three Disney High School Musical movies.

Orrantia recorded the vocals to Houston's "Magic of a Friend" which was on Disney's Tinkerbell and The Lost Treasure soundtrack in 2009. In 2010 Orrantia sang background vocals for Demi Lovato on Disney's Camp Rock 2: The Final Jam soundtrack and background vocals for Miley Cyrus on Disney's Hannah Montana Forever soundtrack.

Her first acting role was at 17, on a commercial for Sprint in 2011. She was cast in the independent film Cooper and the Castle Hills Gang, which premiered at the Dallas International Film Festival.

In the summer of 2011, Orrantia auditioned for the first season of The X Factor. Orrantia was selected from a YouTube video submission and received four "yes" votes from the judges during the live audition phase in Seattle. Although she originally auditioned as a solo artist, during "Hollywood Week", she and three other female singers, were put into a group for the rest of the auditions as Lakoda Rayne. They were eliminated during the fifth week in the live shows.

Since 2013, Orrantia has played Erica Goldberg on the ABC comedy series The Goldbergs. After casting Orrantia and learning of her singing talent, series creator Adam F. Goldberg has written several episodes where Erica sings. Series co star AJ Michalka is also a recording artist, and the two sing together on three of the tracks of The Goldbergs MixTape, released in 2017.

Orrantia had a leading role in the drama film God's Not Dead 2, released on April 1, 2016.

In 2016, she released a single called "Strong, Sweet and Southern". Its music video has had over 400,000 views on YouTube.

In 2019, she debuted The Way Out, an extended play (EP). It has been described as a "very intimate and personal look at her own life."

In 2022, Orrantia competed in season seven of The Masked Singer as "Ringmaster" of Team Good. She made a reference to having known Nicole Scherzinger from The X-Factor back when she was made a member of Lakoda Rayne. Orrantia finished in second place making her the youngest runner-up in the show's history at 28 years old.

Charity work
Orrantia wrote the song "Who I Am" for the National Eating Disorders Association and the song "Power of a Girl" for the Girl Scouts of the USA. She also supports the cancer charities Lungevity, Susan G. Komen, and Stand Up to Cancer. Since 2007, she has served as an ambassador for the Texas Music Project, which raises awareness and funds for music education in public schools.

Filmography

Film

Television

Discography

Extended plays

Singles

Guest appearances

Music videos

References

External links

 
 

1994 births
Living people
21st-century American actresses
21st-century American singers
American television actresses
American film actresses
The X Factor (American TV series) contestants
Singer-songwriters from Texas
Actresses from Texas
People from Arlington, Texas
People from Grand Prairie, Texas
American musicians of Mexican descent
American people of Irish descent
American people of English descent
American people of French descent
American sopranos
American women singer-songwriters
21st-century American women singers
American Christians
American actresses of Mexican descent